Josephine is an unincorporated community in Baldwin County, Alabama, United States.

History
The community is named for Josephine Ross, who was the daughter of the first postmaster. A post office operated under the name Josephine from 1881 to 1959.

Raphael Semmes, who served as the captain of the commerce raider CSS Alabama during the Civil War, had a summer home in Josephine. In 1898, the McPherson family bought the Semmes property. They operated the Mexiwana Hotel on the site of the Semmes home until 1935. A school, which served grades 1–6, operated in Josephine from 1903 to 1917. The community was also home to a bakery before it moved to Foley.

A small sand mound, built by Native Americans who lived in the area, is located near the site of the former Josephine post office. Bamahenge, a full-scale fiberglass replica of Stonehenge, is located on the grounds of Barber Marina outside of Josephine.

References

External links
 Historical photographs of Josephine

Unincorporated communities in Baldwin County, Alabama
Unincorporated communities in Alabama